Ryan Simonetti is an American professional skateboarder who has appeared in several television programs. He has appeared in National Lampoon's TV: The Movie, Wildboyz, Dr. Steve-O, and also in Don't Try This At Home: The Steve-O Video. He has appeared on MTV Cribs in their Jackass episode special.  On May 15, 2008, he appeared on the Late Show with David Letterman where he jumped onto and off a moving U-Haul truck.

TV, film, and releases
TV
Jackass (MTV, 2000-2002)
MTV Cribs (2002)
Wildboyz (MTV, 1 episode, 2006)
2006 Teen Choice Awards (TV special, 2006)
Dr. Steve-O (USA Network, 2007)
Late Show with David Letterman (1 episode, 2008)
Steve-O: Demise and Rise (MTV Special, 2009)
Steve-O: Guilty As Charged (comedy special, 2016)

Movies
The Dudesons Movie (Cameo, 2005)
National Lampoon's TV: The Movie (2007) 
Pinneration the Movie (2008)

DVDs
Don't Try This At Home - The Steve-O Video Vol. 1 (2001)
Don't Try This At Home - The Steve-O Video Vol. 2: The Tour (2002)
Steve-O: Out on Bail (2003) (aka Don't Try This At Home - The Steve-O Video Vol. 3: Out on Bail)

References

External links
 

Living people
American skateboarders
Year of birth missing (living people)
People from Fairfield, California